Mieszków may refer to the following places in Poland:
Mieszków, Lower Silesian Voivodeship (south-west Poland)
Mieszków, Greater Poland Voivodeship (west-central Poland)
Mieszków, Lubusz Voivodeship (west Poland)